Knight Stadium is a 1,000-seat multi-purpose stadium in Buena Vista, Virginia. It is home to the Southern Virginia University Knights football, soccer, and lacrosse teams.

History
Knight Stadium broke ground in 2016. It opened in 2017. In 2018 the final touches were made with the addition of a knight statue.

Knight Stadium Home Records

Knight Stadium Attendance

Top 5 Attendances

References

Buildings and structures in Buena Vista, Virginia
Southern Virginia University
Sports venues in Virginia